Charles Prentiss Orr (February 22, 1858 – May 16, 1922) was a United States district judge of the United States District Court for the Western District of Pennsylvania.

Education and career

Born in Allegheny, Pennsylvania, Orr received an Artium Baccalaureus degree from Hamilton College in 1879 and read law to enter the bar in 1881. He was in private practice in Pittsburgh, Pennsylvania from 1886 to 1909.

Federal judicial service

On March 25, 1909, Orr was nominated by President William Howard Taft to a new seat on the United States District Court for the Western District of Pennsylvania created by 35 Stat. 656. He was confirmed by the United States Senate on April 8, 1909, and received his commission the same day. Orr served in that capacity until his death on May 16, 1922, at his home in Pittsburgh.

References

Sources
 

1858 births
1922 deaths
People from Pittsburgh
Judges of the United States District Court for the Western District of Pennsylvania
United States district court judges appointed by William Howard Taft
20th-century American judges
United States federal judges admitted to the practice of law by reading law